Confins is a Brazilian municipality located in the state of Minas Gerais. Its population as of 2020 is estimated to be 6,800 people. The area of the municipality is 42.008 km². The city belongs to the mesoregion Metropolitana de Belo Horizonte and to the microregion of Belo Horizonte. It is home of the international airport of Belo Horizonte, Tancredo Neves International Airport.

References

External links
 The official site of City of Confins

See also
 List of municipalities in Minas Gerais
 Tancredo Neves International Airport|Confins

Municipalities in Minas Gerais